Songs You Know by Heart: Jimmy Buffett's Greatest Hit(s) is the 18th album and the first greatest hits compilation by American singer-songwriter Jimmy Buffett.  It was released in 1985. The parenthetical "s" in the subtitle alludes to the status at the time of "Margaritaville" as Buffett's single large chart hit.

Despite its 1985 release date, the album only includes songs from 1973 to 1979.  Aside from 1976's Havaña Daydreamin', this compilation includes at least one song from each of Buffett's ABC Records/MCA Records albums released between 1973 and 1979.

Commercial performance
The album reached  No. 100 on the Billboard 200.  The album however has continued to sell, and it was certified Gold  by the RIAA on December 12, 1989, and 7× Platinum on November 21, 2005,  which made it Buffett's most commercially successful. It has sold 5,646,300 copies in the United States as of October 2019.

Track listing
Side 1:
"Cheeseburger in Paradise" (Jimmy Buffett) – 2:53 (From Son of a Son of a Sailor)
"He Went to Paris" (Buffett) – 3:31 (From A White Sport Coat and a Pink Crustacean)
"Fins" (Buffett, Deborah McColl, Barry Chance, Tom Corcoran) – 3:27 (From Volcano)
"Son of a Son of a Sailor" (Buffett) – 3:25 (From Son of a Son of a Sailor)
"A Pirate Looks at Forty" (Buffett) – 3:55 (From A1A)
"Margaritaville" (Buffett) – 4:11 (From Changes in Latitudes, Changes in Attitudes)

Side 2:
"Come Monday" (Buffett) – 3:11 (From Living and Dying in 3/4 Time)
"Changes in Latitudes, Changes in Attitudes" (Buffett) – 3:18 (From Changes in Latitudes, Changes in Attitudes)
"Why Don't We Get Drunk" (Marvin Gardens) – 2:44 (From A White Sport Coat and a Pink Crustacean)
"Pencil Thin Mustache" (Buffett) – 2:52 (From Living and Dying in 3/4 Time)
"Grapefruit—Juicy Fruit" (Buffett) – 2:58 (From A White Sport Coat and a Pink Crustacean)
"Boat Drinks" (Buffett) – 2:38 (From Volcano)
"Volcano" (Buffett, Keith Sykes, Harry Dailey) – 3:38 (From Volcano)

Charts

Weekly charts

Year-end charts

Notes

1985 greatest hits albums
Albums produced by Norbert Putnam
Albums produced by Don Gant
Jimmy Buffett compilation albums
MCA Records compilation albums